Sue Kellaway (born ) is a New Zealand-Australian former television journalist and presenter.

Kellaway worked in her native country, before coming to Australia, where she was the original hostess of breakfast news program, Good Morning Australia, a format based on the American concept of Good Morning America opposite Gordon Elliott, and subsequently on the Nine Network program Today, opposite Steve Liebmann.

Biography

Early career

Kellaway was educated at St Margaret's College, Christchurch and attended the University of Canterbury, she trained as a nurse, before switching to modelling and singing. She then won Miss Universe New Zealand pageant, before entering public relations and advertising.

Career in New Zealand

Kellaway started her career in journalism then in her native New Zealand on television as a reporter and presenter for South Pacific Television

Career in Australia

Kellaway visited Australia in 1980 on a vacation and realized there were not many women working as news anchors at the time. She was selected to host Good Morning Australia, a new breakfast TV news program which was being launched on Rupert Murdoch's Network Ten, and would follow a similar concept to the American morning show Good Morning America'''

In 1982, she moved to co-host the Nine Network's Today'' program, another breakfast show, when it launched and she continued to co-host opposite Steve Liebmann until 1985.

She lives in the United Kingdom with her husband, New Zealand business executive Charles Bidwill, and has homes in Mexico and Portugal

References

Year of birth missing (living people)
Living people
Australian television personalities
Women television personalities
New Zealand expatriates in Australia